Haplochromis paradoxus is a species of haplochromine cichlid endemic to Lake Edward where it is known to be benthopelagic.  This species can reach a length of  SL.

References

paradoxus
paradoxus
Fish described in 2003
Taxonomy articles created by Polbot